is a retired Japanese gymnast. At the 1964 Summer Olympics in Tokyo, he won gold medals in the rings and team all-around events. Individually he finished eighth all around. At the 1970 World Championship he won a bronze medal at the horizontal bar, as well as a team gold.

Later he became a coach and lead the Japanese team at the 1976 Summer Olympics and the 1978 World Championships. He also became a physical education professor at Nippon University, and was inducted into the International Gymnastics Hall of Fame in 2004.

References

External links

 
 

1940 births
Living people
People from Tanabe, Wakayama
Sportspeople from Wakayama Prefecture
Japanese male artistic gymnasts
Gymnasts at the 1964 Summer Olympics
Olympic gymnasts of Japan
Olympic gold medalists for Japan
Olympic medalists in gymnastics
Medalists at the 1964 Summer Olympics
Medalists at the World Artistic Gymnastics Championships
Universiade medalists in gymnastics
Universiade bronze medalists for Japan
Academic staff of Nihon University
Medalists at the 1963 Summer Universiade
20th-century Japanese people
21st-century Japanese people